These are the results of the 1975–76 season for Queens Park Rangers F.C. when they competed in the English Football League First Division. Rangers enjoyed the best season in their history, finishing second in the First Division, a point behind champions Liverpool.

Season summary
Following promotion to the First Division in 1973, Rangers had spent two years gradually building a strong squad, and now announced themselves as one of the most skillful, attractive and entertaining sides in the country, under the stewardship of former Chelsea manager Dave Sexton.

Rangers began the season in superb style by beating Liverpool 2–0 at Loftus Road, with the opening goal by Gerry Francis epitomising the free-flowing football the team would play throughout the season - a pass from Frank McLintock to Stan Bowles, a deft flick through the legs to Francis, a one-two with Don Givens and a low shot despatched past goalkeeper Ray Clemence. BBC Match of the Day viewers would later vote it their 'Goal of the Season.' The following weekend, Rangers produced an even more impressive result by beating reigning champions Derby County 5–1 at the Baseball Ground, Bowles scoring a hat-trick, and four matches later a goal by David Webb ended Manchester United's unbeaten start. Indeed, it was not until their eleventh match that Rangers themselves lost for the first time, going down 2–1 at Leeds United, although they bounced back in their next match by thrashing Everton 5–0.

Four defeats in six matches straddling the New Year saw Rangers slip from top of the table to fifth, but a 2–0 win at Aston Villa in late January set in motion an extraordinary run of 11 wins and a draw that pushed them right back into contention for the League title. By the second weekend in April they were once again top of the table, a point ahead of Liverpool with three matches to play. Crucially, Rangers lost their next match 3–2 at Norwich City on 17 April, allowing Liverpool to reclaim the advantage by beating Stoke City. Both teams then won their penultimate fixtures, and after beating Leeds 2–0 on the final Saturday of the season, 24 April, Rangers were left with an agonising wait as Liverpool did not complete their fixtures until 10 days later on 4 May, at relegation-threatened Wolverhampton Wanderers. Liverpool's superior goal average meant they needed just a draw to become champions, but when Steve Kindon fired the home side into a first-half lead after 15 minutes, Rangers' dream was very much alive. The score remained 1–0 until the final quarter of an hour, but Kevin Keegan scored a dramatic equaliser and two further Liverpool goals handed them the title by a margin of just one point.

Rangers qualified for their first season in Europe, but have never since come close to emulating that fine side.

Results

First Division

Football League Cup

FA Cup

Squad

First Division appearances

Notes and references

Queens Park Rangers F.C. seasons
Queens Park Rangers